Testosterone undecanoate, sold under the brand names Andriol and Aveed among others, is an androgen and anabolic steroid (AAS) medication that is used mainly in the treatment of low testosterone levels in men, including hormone therapy for transgender men. It is taken by mouth or given by injection into muscle.

Side effects of testosterone undecanoate include symptoms of masculinization like acne, increased hair growth, voice changes, hypertension, elevated liver enzymes, hypertriglyceridemia, and increased sexual desire. The drug is a prodrug of testosterone, the biological ligand of the androgen receptor (AR) and hence is an androgen and anabolic steroid. It has strong androgenic effects and moderate anabolic effects, which make it useful for producing masculinization and suitable for androgen replacement therapy. Testosterone undecanoate is a testosterone ester and a prodrug of testosterone in the body. Because of this, it is considered to be a natural and bioidentical form of testosterone.

Testosterone undecanoate was introduced in China for use by injection and in the European Union for use by mouth in the 1970s. It became available for use by injection in the European Union in the early to mid 2000s and in the United States in 2014. Formulations for use by mouth are approved in the United States. Along with testosterone enanthate, testosterone cypionate, and testosterone propionate, testosterone undecanoate is one of the most widely used testosterone esters. However, it has advantages over other testosterone esters in that it can be taken by mouth and in that it has a far longer duration when given by injection. In addition to its medical use, testosterone undecanoate is used to improve physique and performance. The drug is a controlled substance in many countries and so non-medical use is generally illicit.

Medical dosage

Testosterone undecanoate is used in androgen replacement therapy. It is specifically approved only for the treatment of hypogonadism. As an intramuscular injection, it is administered at a dosage of 1,000 mg once every 12 weeks. Conversely, oral testosterone undecanoate must be taken two or three times a day with food.

Side effects

Side effects of testosterone undecanoate include virilization among others.

Anaphylaxis
The Reandron 1000 formulation (Aveed in the United States) contains 1,000 mg of testosterone undecanoate suspended in 4 ml castor oil with benzyl benzoate for solubilization and as a preservative, and is administered by intramuscular injection. As an excipient in Reandron 1000, benzyl benzoate has been reported as a cause of anaphylaxis (a serious life-threatening allergic reaction) in a case in Australia. Bayer includes this report in information for health professionals and recommends that physicians "should be aware of the potential for serious allergic reactions" to preparations of this type. In Australia, reports to the Adverse Drug Reactions Advisory Committee (ADRAC), which evaluates reports of adverse drug reactions for the Therapeutic Goods Administration (TGA), show several reports of allergic reactions since the anaphylaxis case from 2011.

Pharmacology

Pharmacodynamics

Testosterone undecanoate is a prodrug of testosterone and is an androgen and anabolic–androgenic steroid (AAS). That is, it is an agonist of the androgen receptor (AR).

Pharmacokinetics
Testosterone undecanoate has a very long elimination half-life and mean residence time when given as a depot intramuscular injection. Its elimination half-life is 20.9 days and its mean residence time is 34.9 days in tea seed oil, while its elimination half-life is 33.9 days and its mean residence time is 36.0 days in castor oil. These values are substantially longer than those of testosterone enanthate (which, in castor oil, has values of 4.5 days and 8.5 days, respectively). Testosterone undecanoate is administered via intramuscular injection once every three months or so.

Chemistry

Testosterone undecanoate, or testosterone 17β-undecanoate, is a synthetic androstane steroid and a derivative of testosterone. It is an androgen ester; specifically, it is the C17β undecylate (undecanoate) ester of testosterone. A related testosterone ester with a similarly very long duration is testosterone buciclate.

History
In the late 1970s, testosterone undecanoate was introduced for oral use in Europe, although intramuscular testosterone undecanoate had already been in use in China for several years. Intramuscular testosterone undecanoate was not introduced in Europe and the United States until much later, in the early to mid 2000s and 2014, respectively. Testosterone undecanoate was approved in the United States after three previous rejections due to safety concerns.

Society and culture

Generic names
It is also referred to as testosterone undecylate.

Brand names
Testosterone undecanoate is or has been marketed under a variety of brand names, including Andriol, Androxon, Aveed, Cernos Depot, Jatenzo, Nebido, Nebido-R, Panteston, Reandron 1000, Restandol, Sustanon 250, Undecanoate 250, and Undestor.

Availability

Intramuscular testosterone undecanoate is available in the United States, Europe, and elsewhere in the world. It is approved in over 100 countries worldwide. Oral testosterone undecanoate is available in Europe, Mexico, Asia, and in the United States. Intramuscular testosterone undecanoate is marketed most commonly as Nebido in Europe and as Aveed in the United States while oral testosterone undecanoate is marketed most commonly as Andriol.

Legal status
Testosterone undecanoate, along with other AAS, is a schedule III controlled substance in the United States under the Controlled Substances Act and a schedule IV controlled substance in Canada under the Controlled Drugs and Substances Act.

In March 2019, the US Food and Drug Administration (FDA) approved testosterone undecanoate (Jatenzo), an oral testosterone capsule to treat men with certain forms of hypogonadism. These men have low testosterone levels due to specific medical conditions, such as genetic disorders like Klinefelter syndrome or tumors that have damaged the pituitary gland. The FDA granted the approval of Jatenzo to Clarus Therapeutics.

In March 2022, testosterone undecanoate (Tlando) was approved for medical use in the United States.

Research

Non-alcoholic steatohepatitis
In 2013, a phase II clinical trial testing intramuscular testosterone undecanoate for the treatment of non-alcoholic steatohepatitis (NASH) was initiated in the United Kingdom. In the United States in 2018, Lipocine Inc. began investigating the potential of using an oral testosterone undecanoate formulation, known as LPCN-1144, in patients with NASH.

References

External links 
 

Androgens and anabolic steroids
Androstanes
Bayer brands
Contraception for males
Ketones
Testosterone esters
Undecanoate esters